Capreolini is a tribe of deer, containing two extant genera and one extinct genus.

Genera
Extant genera
Capreolus
Hydropotes 
Extinct genera
†Procapreolus- Found during the Miocene/Pliocene boundary.

References 

Deer
Mammal tribes